Perla Helou  (born 10 July 1995) is a Lebanese beauty queen, who was crowned Miss Lebanon in 2017. She participated in Miss World 2017 on November 18 in Sanya, China where she placed 7th in People's Choice, 4th in Multimedia and in the Top 40 overall among the 118 contestants. She also won the head to head challenge of her group.

Biography
Helou studied at Saint Joseph University in Beirut, where she graduated in June 2016, in business administration.  she was pursuing her master's degree in management and marketing at École supérieure des affaires, also in Beirut.

Miss Lebanon 2017
On September 24, 2017, Helou was crowned Miss Lebanon 2017 at Casino du Liban. The pageant was televised on LBCI and LDC. As Miss Lebanon, she competed at the Miss World 2017 pageant. In the final question shew answered the question "In your opinion, can civil society protest movements change the reality of Lebanon?" with "protesters should first agree on the objectives to be achieved in order to ensure the effectiveness of their movement".

Miss World 2017
Helou placed 7th in people's choice, 4th in multimedia and in the top 40 overall among the 118 contestants. She also won the head to head challenge of her group. Helou was among the top 10 in many prediction leaderboards, such as Zardebelleza's leaderboard and others.

After pageantry
Helou supports empowering women.

See also 
 Miss Lebanon
 Miss World 2021

References

1995 births
Living people
Lebanese beauty pageant winners
Saint Joseph University alumni
Miss World 2017 delegates
Lebanese Christians